The Yumiko-chan incident was the rape and murder of five-year-old Japanese girl Yumiko Nagayama (sometimes reported as Yumiko Arakaki) by American soldier Sergeant Isaac J. Hurt in Kadena, Okinawa on September 4, 1955. Nagayama's body was found near Kadena Air Base during the U.S. occupation of Okinawa, and an investigation led to the conviction of 31-year-old Sergeant Hurt on charges of murder, rape, and kidnapping. The Yumiko-chan Incident caused anti-American outrage in Okinawa and contributed to the first major Okinawan protests against the U.S. occupation and military presence.

Preceding events 
Hurt, who was born in Kentucky, had previously served 11 months in jail for assault and attempted rape in Michigan.

Incident
On September 4, 1955, the mutilated body of a young girl was discovered in a landfill belonging to the Kadena Air Base, an installation of the Far East Command in Kadena, Okinawa, at the time governed by the United States Civil Administration of the Ryukyu Islands. The girl was found to have been raped and her body was described as if it had been cut up with a sharp knife from the abdominal region to the bowel.
The girl was identified as Yumiko Nagayama (sometimes reported as Yumiko Arakaki), a five-year-old kindergarten student from Ishikawa (now part of the city of Uruma) who had been reported missing at about 8 p.m when she did not come home from playing outdoors. When a brown hair was discovered on Nagayama's body, investigators suspected that the perpetrator was foreign, prompting a joint investigation by the U.S. military and the Ryukyu Police, the civilian police agency in Okinawa at the time. The investigation suggested that Nagayama was abducted at an Eisa performance where eyewitnesses claimed to have seen her leave with a white man, indicating that the perpetrator was a U.S. serviceman. An indictment was submitted against Sergeant Isaac J. Hurt (sometimes incorrectly reported as Isaac J. Hart) of B Battalion, 32nd Artillery Division, on charges of murder, rape and kidnapping.

Reaction
News of Nagayama's violent rape and murder by a U.S. serviceman provoked outrage among Okinawans, who were further angered by the fact that due to extraterritoriality laws, Nagayama's alleged rapist and murderer would not undergo an Okinawan trial, but rather a U.S. military court-martial. A Rally for Protection of Children was held in Okinawa and the Association for Protection of Children was formed with this incident, and many Okinawans rallied in support of the cause. Okinawans demanded that the U.S. military "Punish offenders of this kind of case with the death penalty without leniency regardless of nationality or ethnicity." Okinawans demanded for the U.S. to have Hurt tried in a civilian court and that the trial be publicly broadcast, but these requests were declined.

Trial
Sergeant Isaac J. Hurt was brought to trial on charges of rape and murder by a U.S. court-martial in Okinawa. He was tried just 14 days after U.S. marine Raymond Parker was sentenced to life in prison for raping a 9-year-old Okinawa girl. Hurt insisted on his innocence, but his court martial lasted 13 days and he was convicted after a deliberation of less than an hour, and sentenced to death. While it was standard procedure, Hurt was returned to the U.S. without the Okinawan public being informed. After sentencing, multiple politicians jumped to his defense.

Representative Carl D. Perkins discussed concerns from his district where Hurt "comes from" that "something could be done about" about the death sentence. Senator Thruston Ballard Morton urged a commutation, saying "The conviction rests upon circumstantial evidence and there exists some doubt concerning the guilt or innocence of the accused." Senator John Sherman Cooper pleaded for the case to be reviewed more carefully. Then Senate Majority Leader Lyndon B. Johnson and Senator Ralph Yarborough asked a law firm to help with Hurt's appeals.

In May 1959, U.S. Army Secretary Wilber M. Brucker recommended that Hurt's death sentence be carried out. "I have studied this case carefully," he said. "And I am convinced of the guilt of the accused." Pointing to his prior convictions and his false statements on his enlistment papers, Brucker said Hunt had a history of being both a rapist and a liar. However, in 1960, in response to increasing pressure, Hunt's sentence was reduced to 45 years - without the possibility of parole - by President Dwight D. Eisenhower in 1960.

Release from prison 
Following the commutation of his death sentence, Hurt was transferred to USP Leavenworth where he suffered a stroke in 1969. He wrote letters to Senators and members of the U.S. government requesting to be granted parole or his case to be dismissed. In one letter, he alleged, “I was sacrificed to appease the dissident political elements who were demanding an end to American mil. [military] Occupation.”

In January 1977, President Gerald Ford granted Hurt’s request to be made eligible for parole, and he was released from prison later that year. Following his release, Hurt found work as a night watchman, and got married in 1981. On August 6, 1984, he died at a Department of Veterans Affairs hospital in Ohio State. Hurt's grave in Reading Cemetery, Hamilton County, Ohio State, is marked with a headstone, provided by the Department of Veterans' Affairs, noting his service in World War II.

Aftermath
The Yumiko-chan Incident caused an increase in Okinawan opposition against the United States Civil Administration of the Ryukyu Islands and ten years of U.S. military occupation in Okinawa, and led to further debate over the continued presence of U.S. forces in Japan. It was the springboard for the first serious, coordinated anti-U.S. military protests in Okinawa following the beginning of the occupation in 1945.

On September 23, 2021, Okinawa Times reported about the release of Hurt and the Department of Veterans' Affairs' provision of his grave marker, despite his conviction for rape and murder of a minor. Okinawan peace activists, including Suzuyo Takazato, expressed anger at the release and the U.S. government's decision to supply such a headstone.

See also
Rape during the occupation of Japan
Sexual assault in the U.S. military
1945 Katsuyama killing incident
1995 Okinawa rape incident
2002 Okinawa Michael Brown incident

References

1955 murders in Japan
1955 in military history
September 1955 events in Asia
Child abuse resulting in death
Child sexual abuse in Japan
Deaths by blade weapons
Events that led to courts-martial
Japan–United States relations
Murdered Japanese children
1950s in Okinawa
People murdered in Japan
Politics of Japan
Rape in Japan
Torture in Japan
United States military scandals
United States Armed Forces in Okinawa Prefecture
United States Marine Corps in the 20th century
Female murder victims
Incidents of violence against girls